Patricio Albacete (born 9 December 1981 in Buenos Aires) is an Argentine rugby union player. He currently plays for Stade Toulousain in the top level of French rugby, the Top 14 competition. He has also represented the national Argentina team, including being a part of their 2003 Rugby World Cup squad. His usual position is at lock. He won the Top 14 in 2008 and the 2009–10 Heineken Cup. In January, Patricio Albacete announced on his official website that he signed a new 4 years deal with Stade Toulousain.

References

External links

Official Website
UAR profile
 Patricio Albacete on rwc2003.irb.com
RWC 2007 profile
 Patricio Albacete on ercrugby.com

1981 births
Rugby union players from Buenos Aires
Argentine rugby union players
Living people
Rugby union locks
Stade Toulousain players
Racing 92 players
Expatriate rugby union players in France
Argentina international rugby union players
Argentine expatriate sportspeople in France
Argentine expatriate rugby union players